Kireedam is a 1989 Indian Malayalam-language action drama film directed by Sibi Malayil and written by A. K. Lohithadas. The film stars Mohanlal, Thilakan, and Parvathy Jayaram, along with Kaviyoor Ponnamma, Mohan Raj, Murali, Sreenath, Kundara Johny, Cochin Haneefa, Jagathy Sreekumar, Philomina, Usha, Jagadish, Maniyanpilla Raju, Mamukkoya, Oduvil Unnikrishnan, and Kanakalatha in supporting roles. The music for the film was composed by Johnson.

The film is about a youth, Sethumadhavan (Mohanlal), whose hopes and aspirations are shattered by a combination of fate and human falling. It explores how society type-casts individuals and forces them to act that part whether they like it or not. Mohanlal won the National Film Award – Special Mention "for portraying young man's agony and pain marvellously and in unique style". Lohithadas won the Kerala Film Critics Award for Best Screenplay. The title 'Kireedam' refers to the metaphorical crown that the villagers of Ramapuram bestows upon Sethumadhavan after he kills Keerikadan Jose.

Kireedam was released on 7 July 1989. It was a major commercial success at the box office. It received widespread critical acclaim and praise for the performances of Mohanlal and Thilakan, the screenplay, and the soundtrack. It is regarded as one of the classics in Indian cinema. A sequel to the film titled Chenkol was released in 1993. Kireedam was remade into six other languages — in Telugu as Rowdyism Nasinchali (1990), in Kannada as Modada Mareyalli (1991), in Hindi as Gardish (1993), in Bengali Bangladesh as Babar Adesh (1995), in Bengali as Nayak-The Real Hero  (2005) and in Tamil as Kireedam (2007) - becoming Mohanlal's first movie to be remade in six other languages. In 2007, it became the third Indian movie to be remade in six other languages after Poovinu Puthiya Poonthennal and Anuraga Aralithu.

Plot 
Achuthan Nair, an honest and sincere police constable, has a loving family consisting of his wife Ammu, two sons and two daughters. Achuthan Nair wants his elder son Sethumadhavan to become a police inspector. He has a cordial and amiable relationship with his son. Sethu is engaged to Devi, the daughter of Krishnan Nair, his maternal uncle. One day, for charging a petty case against the son of a Member of Legislative Assembly, Achuthan Nair is transferred to Ramapuram police station and his family moves with him.

Keerikadan Jose, a hardcore criminal, rules the market of Ramapuram by running an extortion racket. One day, Achuthan Nair tries to intervene in a scuffle involving him and is beaten quite brutally by Jose. Sethu, who was in the market at the time, witnesses this and saves his father by attacking Keerikadan Jose and his goons. Keerikadan gets severely wounded and is admitted to the hospital. The entire market celebrates the fall of Keerikadan and finds a new saviour in Sethu. His friends take advantage of this notoriety, and eventually, start a brawl in the local pub. Achuthan Nair is deeply disturbed by this series of events and accuses Sethu of slowly turning into a criminal. Though he tries to stay out of trouble, Sethu is gradually dragged into one mess after another.

Haidrose, a local thug, claims to be a henchman of Sethu and starts collecting extortion money from the local traders. Ramanan, Sethu's brother-in-law, joins Haidrose. Sethu, upon learning of this, beats both of them up at the market. However, at home Ramanan gives a false account of what happened; convinced that his son was in the wrong, Achuthan Nair asks Sethu to leave the house and Sethu walks out. The local police inspector arrests Sethu on a petty case and warns him not to cause more trouble. Keshu, his childhood friend, tries to pacify him; Sethu breaks down completely.

In the meantime, Devi's parents fix her marriage to a different man, which Devi isn't prepared to accept. Sethu meets Devi, explains his helplessness and asks her to follow her parents' wishes. She gets married; Sethu ends up feeling lonelier than ever. After getting discharged from the hospital, Keerikadan Jose decides to take his revenge on Sethu. He also decides to severely punish anyone who celebrated his "death". He ransacks Sethu's home and manhandles his mother and sisters. Sethu is attacked by Parameshwaran, the lieutenant of Keerikadan. In a bid to defend himself, Sethu grabs an iron rod and proceeds to assault him with it. Parameshwaran gets seriously injured and is admitted to the hospital.

Sethumadhavan is targeted, once again, by Keerikkadan Jose. They engage in a fight, and Sethumadhavan goes into a hysterical rage. With blood dripping from his face, he threatens to murder anybody who comes near him. Keerikkadan is seriously injured and tries to get up, but Sethu takes up a dagger and stabs him to death.

Achuthan Nair enters the scene and commands Sethu to drop his dagger, which he complies with after several tense moments. Both of them become highly emotional and Sethu falls to his knees, utterly spent, after tossing the dagger aside. The film ends with Sethumadhavan being disqualified from entering the police force. Head Constable Achuthan Nair reads the Police Verification Report which cites Sethu as a "notorious criminal".

Cast 

Mohanlal as Sethumadhavan
Thilakan as Head Constable Achuthan Nair, Sethu's father
Parvathy as Devi, Sethu's cousin and love interest
Kaviyoor Ponnamma as Ammu, Sethu's mother
Mohan Raj as Keerikadan Jose
Sankaradi as Krishnan Nair, Sethu's maternal uncle and Devi's father
Sreenath as Keshu, Sethu's friend
Cochin Haneefa as Haidrose
Jagathy Sreekumar as Ramanan, Sethu's brother-in law
Murali as Lokanathan, Sub-Inspector (SI) of  Ramapuram Station
Philomina as Muthasshi- Krishnan Nair's and Ammu's elderly mother and Sethu's maternal grandmother
Usha as Latha, Sethumadhavan's younger sister 
Jagadish as Suresh
Maniyanpilla Raju as Najeeb 
Mamukkoya as Constable Hameed- Najeeb's father 
Oduvil Unnikrishnan as Assistant Sub-inspector (ASI) Gopalakrishnan Nair, Suresh's father
Kundara Johny as Parameshwaran
Thikkurissy Sukumaran Nair as Santhosh, Shop-owner 
Yadu Krishnan as Rameshan, Sethu's youngest brother
Kanakalatha as Ambika -Sethumadhavan's older sister and Ramanan's wife
Santhakumari as Bharathi, Krishnan Nair's wife and Devi's mother
Kollam Thulasi as Sub-inspector Jayaraj
Poojappura Radhakrishnan

Production

Development 
A. K. Lohithadas got the plot idea from a story that circulated in his locality about an incident that happened in Chalakudy that narrates how a carpenter knocked down a notorious criminal named Keshavan with a single hit. Lohithadas, who was unable to attend the wedding of Sibi Malayil, wrote the screenplay of Kireedam as a compensation gift for Malayil. He completed the screenplay in just six days. Filming was completed in 25 days in Thiruvananthapuram. The film cost ₹23.5 lakh to make, produced by Dinesh Panicker and N. Krishnakumar under the company Kripa Films. Kireedam (crown) was originally the title given by Lohithadas for his previous screenplay, directed by I. V. Sasi. But Sasi did not like the name and had a dispute with Lohithadas. Malayil on hearing this incident from Lohithadas said he would like to adopt the title for his film. Sasi's film was released under the title Mukthi (1988).

Casting 
Mohanlal, who used to receive ₹4.5 lakh as remuneration at that time took only ₹4 lakh for his friendship with Krishnakumar. Initially, Thilakan declined the role of Achuthan Nair due to scheduling conflicts with the films Chanakyan (1989) and Varnam (1989). The film, originally planned to shoot at Nemmara and Chittur in Palakkad district was changed to Thiruvananthapuram to accommodate Thilakan who was filming for Varnam at Thiruvananthapuram. Thilakan joined the shoot of Kireedam during the intervals of Varnam. 

The makers initially chose Pradeep Shakthi for the role of Keerikkadan Jose, who had acted in Chamaram (1980) and was then an established actor in Telugu films. Shakthi also agreed to do the film and was given advance payment. Shakthi, who was supposed to arrive on the day of filming, did not come due to reasons best known for him, they were compelled to make an immediate replacement. It was an associate director who suggested the name of beginner Mohan Raj, who had acted in a minor role in Moonnam Mura. Upon seeing Raj, he was immediately fixed. His character name Keerikkadan Jose later became his stage name. Dubbing artist Nirmal Prakash gave voice to the character.

Filming 
The climax scene featuring Mohanlal and Thilakan was shot in Aryanadu. Instead of the melancholic song "Kanneer Poovinte", a romantic song was originally shot to feature the romance between Sethumadhavan and Devi. But after realizing it would not align in the story-line, it was scrapped. Since there was not enough time to complete the shoot of "Kanneer Poovinte", some of the scenes shot for the romantic song was used in it. The shot where Mohanlal is walking alone through a long lane in the song was filmed in Chennai. The song's composition was a modified version of the romantic song. S. Kumar was the cinematographer.

The climactic action between Sethumadhavan and Keerikadan Jose in the film was not choreographed by a stunt coordinator nor rehearsed. Sibi Malayil shot it as an impromptu brawl where both Mohanlal and Mohan Raj, improvised blow after blow staying within the framing limits set by two cameras.

Soundtrack

The film features original soundtrack composed by Johnson, which consists of two songs written by Kaithapram Damodaran. The song "Kaneer Poovinte" won M. G. Sreekumar his first Kerala State Film Awards.

Awards
National Film Awards
 National Film Award (Special Mention) – Mohanlal
Kerala State Film Awards
 Kerala State Film Award for Best Male Playback Singer – M. G. Sreekumar
Kerala Film Critics Association Awards
 Kerala Film Critics Award for Best Screenplay – A. K. Lohithadas

Reception 
Upon release the film received widespread critical acclaim. In a 1989 reader's poll conduced by Nana Magazine the film was voted the Second Best Film of the year. In a later review, NKS of The Indian Express wrote, "Mohanlal underplays his role as the head constable's son, even as Thilakam playing the cop brings all the experience of his long career to bear on the role". The climactic scene of the film is iconic and is considered one of Mohanlal's greatest onscreen performances. In a 2019 review of the film Fahir Maithutty of The News Minute wrote, "It's effortless how Mohanlal makes us realise the evolution of the character. The climax where he just chews on while waving the knife at police is just another instance of the minute details Mohanlal brings to keep improvising on screen."

Remakes

Legacy
Kireedam is regarded as a classic in Malayalam cinema, particularly noted for its screenplay and the performances of the lead cast. Mohanlal won his first National Film Award for the film. The dialogue "Ninte achanaada parayunne, kathi thaazhe ideda" of Thilakan's Achuthan Nair in the climax of the film became a catchphrase. The impact of the film was such that Mohan Raj, his character name, Keerikkadan Jose, became his stage name. Kireedam gave a break for Cochin Haneefa who appeared in a comical role, Hydros, until then, Haneefa was known for portraying antagonistic roles. He began appearing in more comedic roles after Kireedam and would be best known for his comedic roles in the later half of his career.

A bridge on Vellayani Lake featured in the film (including the song "Kanneer Poovinte") would go on to be known as "Kireedam Paalam" (Kireedam bridge). Later many films were shot there, but it continues to be known by the name. It is the only location in Thiruvananthapuram that is known by a film's name. Kireedam, the screenplay was released as a book by Mathrubhumi Books in 2009.

References

External links

1989 films
1980s Malayalam-language films
Indian action drama films
Indian films based on actual events
Malayalam films remade in other languages
Films directed by Sibi Malayil
Films with screenplays by A. K. Lohithadas
Films shot in Thiruvananthapuram
EKireedom1
1989 action films
1989 drama films
Films scored by Johnson